The Deputy Chief of Chaplains (DCCH) serves as the chief strategist for the U.S. Army Chaplain Corps and senior coordinating general officer for actions assigned to Assistant Chiefs of Chaplains (Reserve Component) and the USACHCS Chief of Chaplains of the United States Army. As directed by the CCH, serves as the intermediate rater for senior-level active duty chaplains. The current DCCH is Chaplain (Brigadier General) William Green Jr.

U.S. Army Deputy Chiefs of Chaplains

See also
Chiefs of Chaplains of the United States
International Military Chiefs of Chaplains Conference

References

United States Army Deputy
 
Deputy